Walter K Gear is an astrophysicist, professor of physics and head of the School of Physics and Astronomy at Cardiff University. Dr. Gear's research is largely concerned with star formation in galaxies.

Having completed a BSc and PhD at Queen Mary, University of London, Gear worked at the Royal Observatory Edinburgh where he managed the construction of the SCUBA camera for the James Clerk Maxwell Telescope in Hawaii. Gear has been at Cardiff since 1999, where he set up and leads the Astronomy Instrumentation Group, and has been Head of School since 2005. Gear was involved in the QUaD CMB Polarization experiment.

References

External links
Astronomy Instrumentation group at Cardiff University

Living people
Academics of Cardiff University
Academics of the University of Edinburgh
Alumni of Queen Mary University of London
Year of birth missing (living people)